The year 1830 in science and technology involved some significant events, listed below.

Astronomy
 March 16 – Great Comet of 1830 (C/1830 F1, 1830 I) first observed in Mauritius.
 Johann Heinrich Mädler and Wilhelm Beer produce the first map of the surface of Mars.

Biology

 Charles Bell publishes his Nervous System of the Human Body.
 William Jackson Hooker commences publication of The British Flora.

Exploration
 October 14 –  returns to England from her first voyage, a hydrographic survey of the Patagonia and Tierra del Fuego regions of South America.
 Southern Ocean Expedition – John Biscoe sets out from England on an expedition to find new seal-hunting grounds in the Southern Ocean.

Geology
 Charles Lyell publishes the first volume of his Principles of Geology, being an attempt to explain the former changes of the Earth's surface, by reference to causes now in operation.

Medicine
 Thomas Southwood Smith publishes the standard textbook A Treatise on Fever in London.
 Approximate date – The chain osteotome, a form of chainsaw, is invented by German orthopaedist Bernhard Heine.

Technology
 July 13 – John Ruggles is granted United States patent No. 1, for applying rack railway equipment to the "Locomotive steam-engine for rail and other roads".
 August 31 – Edwin Budding is granted a United Kingdom patent for the lawnmower.
 Aeneas Coffey is granted a United Kingdom patent for an improved column still.
 Eaton Hodgkinson publishes his pioneering paper on the optimum cross section for cast iron structural beams.
 Stephen H. Long designs the Long truss wooden bridge.

Institutions
 Geographical Society of London established.

Publications
 Charles Babbage publishes Reflections on the Decline of Science in England, and on Some of Its Causes.

Awards
 Copley Medal: not awarded

Births
 March 5  – Étienne-Jules Marey (died 1904), French physiologist.
 March 5 – Charles Wyville Thomson (died 1882), Scottish marine biologist.
 April 21 – Clémence Royer (died 1902), French anthropologist.
 May 10 – François-Marie Raoult (died 1901), French chemist.
 May 11 (April 29 O.S.) – Emanoil Bacaloglu (died 1891), Romanian polymath.
 August 19 – Lothar Meyer (died 1895), German chemist.
 October 24 – Marianne North (died 1890), English botanist.
 November 20 – Sigismond Jaccoud (died 1913), Swiss physician.

Deaths
 March 2 – Samuel Thomas von Sömmerring (born 1755), German physician, anatomist, paleontologist and inventor.
 March 29 – James Rennell (born 1742), English cartographer and oceanographer.
 May 16 – Joseph Fourier (born 1768), French mathematician.
 August 24 – Louis Jean Pierre Vieillot (born 1748), French ornithologist.
 Clelia Durazzo Grimaldi (born 1760), Italian botanist.

References

 
19th century in science
1830s in science